Lentiira is a medium-sized wilderness lake of Finland. It belongs to Oulujoki main catchment area and it is situated in Kuhmo municipality in the Kainuu region. The lake is quite narrow and deep with long bays. It belongs to Lentiira–Iivantiira–Lentua kayaking route named The Tar Route.

References

See also
List of lakes in Finland

Lakes of Kuhmo